The 1976–77 Houston Aeros season was the Aeros' fifth season of operation in the World Hockey Association. The Aeros finished first in the West to qualify for the playoffs. The Aeros would lose in the semi-finals to the Winnipeg Jets.

Offseason

Regular season

Final standings

Game log

Playoffs
The Aeros defeated the Edmonton Oilers in the Division Semi-final 4–1. In the Division Final, the Aeros were defeated by the Winnipeg Jets 4–2 in a rematch of the 1976 Avco Cup final.

Houston Aeros 4, Edmonton Oilers 1 – Semifinals

Winnipeg Jets 4, Houston Aeros 2 – Division Finals

Player stats

Note: Pos = Position; GP = Games played; G = Goals; A = Assists; Pts = Points; +/- = plus/minus; PIM = Penalty minutes; PPG = Power-play goals; SHG = Short-handed goals; GWG = Game-winning goals
      MIN = Minutes played; W = Wins; L = Losses; T = Ties; GA = Goals-against; GAA = Goals-against average; SO = Shutouts;

Awards and records

Transactions

Draft picks
Houston's draft picks at the 1976 WHA Amateur Draft.

Farm teams

See also
1976–77 WHA season

References

External links

Houston
Houston
Houston Aeros seasons